The View from The Shard is an observation deck between the 68th and 72nd floors of The Shard, the tallest building in London. The View from The Shard consists of a triple level indoor gallery on the 69th floor and a partially outdoor gallery on the 72nd floor. It was opened on 1 February 2013 by the then Mayor of London Boris Johnson. In its first year of opening, it was visited by 900,000 people and made a profit of over £5 million.

Indoor Viewing Gallery  

The triple-height main viewing gallery on the 69th floor gives 360-degree views of up to 40 miles (60 km). It is equipped with interactive digital telescopes named "Tell-scopes" which can identify famous landmarks and places of interest, and provide information about them in 10 different languages.

Partially Outdoor Viewing Gallery  

The gallery on the 72nd floor is the highest public level of the building at a height of 800 ft (244 m). This gallery is partially open-air, providing views of the pinnacle of the building and 360-degree views around the building.

Amenities 
The lifts travel at seven metres per second. Including a transfer of lifts on the 33rd floor, the time from the lobby to the 68th floor is approximately one minute.

The visitor toilets have panoramic windows with views over the River Thames and City of London, with optional electric blinds.

An orchestral and choral soundtrack performed by The London Symphony Orchestra and The Joyful Company of Singers was created for the venue and is played throughout.

References

External links
 
  A video of the window cleaners on the Shard

Tourist attractions in the London Borough of Southwark